Venantius Honorius Clementianus Fortunatus ( 530 600/609 AD), known as Saint Venantius Fortunatus, was a Latin poet and hymnographer in the Merovingian Court, and a bishop of the Early Church who has been venerated since the Middle Ages.

Life
Venantius Fortunatus was born between 530 and 540 AD at Duplavis (or Duplavilis), near Treviso in Veneto, Italy. He grew up during the Roman reconquest of Italy, but there is controversy concerning as to where Fortunatus spent his childhood. Some historians, such as D. Tardi, suggest that Fortunatus’ family moved to Aquileia because of the turbulent political situation in Treviso after the death of King Theoderic. This theory is suggested because there is evidence of Fortunatus speaking warmly about one of the bishops there, Bishop Paul of Aquileia. Other scholars, such as Judith George, suggest that his family never moved to Aquileia, pointing out that the poet speaks more of Duplavis than any other place regarding his childhood.
Sometime in the 550s or 60s, he travelled to Ravenna to study. While there, he was given a classical education, in the Roman style.  His later work shows familiarity with not only classical Latin poets such as Virgil, Horace, Ovid, Statius, and Martial, but also Christian poets, including Arator, Claudian, and Coelius Sedulius, and bears their influence. In addition, Fortunatus likely had some knowledge of the Greek language and the classical Greek writers and philosophers, as he makes reference to them and Greek words at times throughout his poetry and prose.

Fortunatus eventually moved to Metz in the spring of 566, probably with the specific intention of becoming a poet at the Merovingian Court. It was there his successful career really began. To reach Metz, he took a winding route, passing through four modern countries: Italy, Austria, Germany and France. Fortunatus himself explains two entirely different reasons for this route. Describing the first reason, he “portrays himself in the guise of a wandering minstrel, his journey just one in a series of adventures.”  The second reason is more religious, explaining in his Vita S. Martini that he took this route to worship at the shrine of St Martin in Tours, visiting other shrines as he went.

Fortunatus’ arrival in Metz coincides with the marriage of King Sigibert and Queen Brunhild, and at the ceremony he performed a celebration poem for the entire court. After this incident, Fortunatus had many noble patrons, as well as bishops, who wished him to write poetry for them. About a year after he arrived in Metz, Fortunatus travelled to the court of King Charibert, Sigibert's brother, in Paris, and stayed there until Charibert's death in 567 or 568. Due to danger presented by King Chilperic, brother of Sigibert and Charibert, Fortunatus had to move south to Tours, returning to Sigibert's lands. From there, he ventured to Poitiers where he met Radegund. They became close friends, and Fortunatus wrote many poems in her honour and in support of her political campaigns.
Fortunatus had made another great friendship in Tours and Poitiers: with Gregory of Tours, who was installed as Bishop of Tours in 573, from whom Fortunatus also received patronage. In 580, Fortunatus wrote a poem defending Gregory against treasonous charges placed upon him at Chilperic's court. 
After the death of Sigibert, and that of Chilperic, Fortunatus moved to Childebert’s court in Poitiers. Childebert was Sigibert’s son. Sometime around 576, he was ordained into the church. He stayed there until around the year 599-600, when he was appointed Bishop of Poitiers, to replace Plato, Bishop of Poitiers. Fortunatus died in the early 7th century. He was called a saint after his death, but was never formally canonized.

Works
Fortunatus is best known for two poems that have become part of the liturgy of the Catholic Church, the Pange lingua gloriosi proelium certaminis ("Sing, O tongue, of the glorious struggle"), a hymn that later inspired St Thomas Aquinas's Pange Lingua Gloriosi Corporis Mysterium.  He also wrote Vexilla Regis prodeunt ("The royal banners forward go"), which is a sequence  sung at Vespers during Holy Week.  This poem was written in honour of a large piece of the True Cross, which explains its association also with the feast of the Exaltation of the Holy Cross.  The relic had been sent from the Byzantine Emperor Justin II to Queen Radegund of the Franks, who after the death of her husband Chlotar I had founded a monastery in Poitiers.  The Municipal Library in Poitiers houses an 11th-century manuscript on the life of Radegunde, copied from a 6th-century account by Fortunatus.

Venantius Fortunatus wrote eleven surviving books of poetry in Latin in a diverse group of genres including epitaphs, panegyrics, georgics, consolations, and religious poems. A major genre of Fortunatus’ poetry is the panegyric. He wrote four major panegyrics to four Merovingian Kings: Sigibert and Brunhild, Charibert, Chilperic  and Childebert II and Brunhild. The first was also his debut into the Merovingian Court in Gaul, at Metz, in honour of the marriage of Sigibert and Brunhild. It is a fanciful poem, telling the story of how the bride and groom were brought together by Cupid, recalling the style of the classical Latin poets. The second, for Charibert, celebrates his rule, and gives the impression that this Frankish king is descended from and succeeded the Roman kings in an unbroken line. This means that he has a legitimate rule. The third, addressed to King Chilperic, is full of controversy. Chilperic was known as a headstrong and hot-tempered ruler, however in this panegyric, Fortunatus depicts him as being gracious, compassionate and merciful, never making judgements too quickly, and even praises the king's poetry.  The poem was given on the occasion of the trial for treason of Gregory of Tours, Fortunatus’ patron and friend. Some scholars have suggested that Fortunatus is simply trying to appease a new patron (Chilperic) because of Gregory's uncertain future. However, other scholars, such as Brennan and George, disagree, postulating that Fortunatus was evoking more of a correctional and moralistic poem towards Chilperic, reminding him how the ideal king ruled, and gently suggesting that he act in that way as well. Thus, the poem becomes a plea for his friend Gregory of Tours, while avoiding an open disagreement with the king.

Fortunatus wrote panegyrics and other types of poems, including praise, eulogies, personal poems to bishops and friends alike, consolations and poems in support of political issues, particularly those presented by his friends Gregory of Tours and Radegunde. 
His eleven books of poetry contain his surviving poems, all ordered chronologically and by importance of subject. For instance, a poem about God will come before the panegyric to a king, which will come before a eulogy to a bishop. This collection of poems is the main primary source for writing about his life.

His verse is important in the development of later Latin literature, largely because he wrote at a time when Latin prosody was moving away from the quantitative verse of classical Latin and towards the accentual meters of medieval Latin. His style sometimes suggests the influence of Hiberno-Latin, in learned Greek coinages that occasionally appear in his poems.

Fortunatus' other major work was Vita S. Martini  It is a long narrative poem, reminiscent of the classical epics of Greek and Roman cultures but replete with Christian references and allusions, depicting the life of Saint Martin.
He also wrote a verse hagiography of his patron Queen Radegund (continued by the nun Baudovinia).

His hymns are used extensively in the Hymnal 1982 of the Episcopal Church.  One of his hymns was set to music by the modern composer Randall Giles. Another hymn as translated from the Latin (Welcome, happy morning! age to age shall say) celebrates Easter with music by Sir Arthur Sullivan.

Impact and contributions
In his time, Fortunatus filled a great social desire for Latin poetry. He was one of the most prominent poets at this point, and had many contracts, commissions and correspondences with kings, bishops and noblemen and women from the time he arrived in Gaul until his death. He used his poetry to advance in society, to promote political ideas he supported, usually conceived of by Radegunde or by Gregory, and to pass on personal thoughts and communications. He was a master wordsmith and because of his promotion of the church, as well as the Roman tendencies of the Frankish royalty, he remained in favour with most of his acquaintances throughout his lifetime.

From the point of view of the present day, Fortunatus provides another window into the world of the Merovingian court. For much of this period, the only reliable source on the subject is Gregory of Tours’ history, but as it is well known that Gregory had his own political and personal agendas, the objectivity of his accounts can sometimes come into question. While Fortunatus tends to embellish or even mock the happenings and truth of the situations he writes about, there is an element of inferred truth, whether it is his classical embellishments on the marriage panegyric for Sigibert, or his recalling the traits of the ideal ruler to correct a bad king. With this, he supplies an alternate view of everything going on at court, a view which at times differs from Gregory's account.

His works have been set to music in settings which themselves have become prominent artworks.  Anton Bruckner composed a motet based on Vexilla Regis, and Knut Nystedt a choral setting of O Crux Splendidior.

Feast Day
Fortunatus is a saint of the Christian Church, commemorated on 14 December.

References

Further reading 
 Brennan, Brian. "The career of Venantius Fortunatus", Traditio, Vol 41 (1985), 49–78.
 Brennan Brian. "The image of Frankish Kings in the poetry of Venantius Fortunatus", Journal of Medieval History Vol. 3 (March 1984). 
 Brennan Brian. "The image of the Merovingian Bishop in the poetry of Venantius Fortunatus", Journal of Medieval History Vol 6 (June 1992). 
 George, J. Venantius Fortunatus: Personal and Political Poems. Liverpool: Liverpool University Press, 1995.
 George, J. Venantius Fortunatus: A Latin Poet in Merovingian Gaul. Oxford: Clarendon Press, 1992.
 Heikkinen, Seppo. "The Poetry of Venantius Fortunatus: The Twilight of Roman Metre," in Maria Gourdouba, Leena Pietilä-Castrén & Esko Tikkala (edd), The Eastern Mediterranean in the Late Antique and Early Byzantine Periods (Helsinki, 2004) (Papers and Monographs of the Finnish Institute at Athens, IX),
 Reydellet, M.  Venance Fortunat, Poèmes, 3 vols., Collection Budé, 1994–2004.
 Roberts, Michael.  The Humblest Sparrow: The Poetry of Venantius Fortunatus. Ann Arbor, Michigan: University of Michigan, 2009.  
 Roberts, Michael, ed. and trans., Venantius Fortunatus Poems. Cambridge, MA: Harvard University Press, 2017.  
"Venantius Fortunatus", in The Saints:  A Concise Biographical Dictionary (1958), reprint, n.d., New York:  Guild Press.

External links 

 MGH Auctores antiquissimi IV.1 - Friedrich Leo 1881 Venanti Honori Clementiani Fortunati - Presbyteri Italici, Opera Poetica; digitalized (Latin)
 MGH Auctores antiquissimi IV.2 - Bruno Krusch 1885 Venanti Honori Clementiani Fortunati - Presbyteri Italici, Opera Pedestria; digitalized (Latin)
 Catholic Encyclopedia: St. Venantius Fortunatus
 Poems at The Latin Library (Latin)
 orbilat.com  Pange Lingua (Latin)
 
 
 
 Review by William E. Klingshirn, The Catholic University of America - Judith W. George, Venantius Fortunatus: A Latin Poet in Merovingian Gaul. Oxford: Clarendon Press, 1992. Pp. xiii + 234. 
 PDF of Proprium Dioeceos Victoriensis Venetorum - Propers for the Mass on the Feast of St. Venantius, pp. 3–6 (Latin)

530 births
600s deaths
People from the Province of Treviso
6th-century Frankish bishops
7th-century Frankish saints
Bishops of Poitiers
6th-century Latin writers
Christian poets
Medieval Latin poets
6th-century Frankish writers
Hagiographers
Italian Roman Catholic saints
6th-century poets
Hymnographers